John Kerr (8 April 1885 – 27 December 1972) was a Scottish cricketer from Greenock.

A right-handed batsman, Kerr represented Scotland for 26 years and is their longest serving player of all time. His unbeaten 178 against Ireland in Dublin remained a national record for 3 decades until it was passed by James Aitchison. Aitchison was also the man to pass his record tally of 1975 runs for Scotland. Kerr played club cricket for Greenock and scored 21558 runs for them and made 49 hundreds.

He was also the cousin of the Scottish double international, James Reid-Kerr.

References

External links 
Cricket Europe

1885 births
1972 deaths
Cricketers from Greenock
Scottish cricketers